Field hockey events were contested at the 1986 Asian Games in Seongnam, South Korea.

Medalists

Medal table

Results

Men

Preliminary round

Group A

Group B

Classification 5th–8th

Semifinals

7th place match

5th place match

Final round

Semifinals

Bronze medal match

Final

Final standing

Women

References
 Asian Games field hockey medalists

 
1986 Asian Games events
1986
Asian Games
1986 Asian Games